Kotelnikovo is an airbase of the Russian Air Force located near Kotelnikovo, Volgograd Oblast, Russia.

The base is home to the 704th Training Aviation Regiment.

References

Russian Air Force bases